Calauan, officially the Municipality of Calauan,  is a 2nd class municipality in the province of Laguna, Philippines. The municipality has a land area of 25.25 square miles which constitutes 3.41% of Laguna's total area. According to the 2020 census, it has a population of 87,693 people.

The town got its name from the term kalawang, which means rust. Folklore has it that the town got its name when the Spanish started construction of the Municipal Church and water seeped in from the holes dug into the ground for the Church's foundation. The water was colored brown and rusty in character hence the name Calauan (Kalawang). Calauan is known for the Pineapple Festival, which is celebrated every 15 May.

The patron saint of Calauan is Isidore the Laborer, the patron of farmers, known in Spanish as San Isidro Labrador.

Calauan's population is expected to rise, as the town is being used as resettlement of informal settlers in Metro Manila through the Bayan ni Juan and the Kapit-Bisig para sa Ilog Pasig project of the ABS-CBN Foundation.

Popular destinations in the area include the Field of Faith situated in Barangay Lamot 2 and the Isdaan Floating Restaurant located along the National Highway going to Victoria Laguna.

History

The fertile soil of Calauan attracted the oattention of Captain Juan de Salcedo, when he passed through Laguna and Tayabas (now Quezon) on his way to Bicol Region in 1570. Ten years later, Spanish authorities established a town government two kilometers from the site of the present Poblacion, in what is now Barrio Mabacan. They called the townsite “Calauan” (Tagalog word for rust). Following in epidemic in 1703, the town was moved to its present site at the fork of three roads---now to the south-west leading to San Pablo City, the other southeastward to Santa Cruz, the provincial capital, and the third going North to Manila.

At the turn of the 18th century, when Bay was designated as the provincial capital of Laguna, Calauan became a sitio of Bay. Merchants going to Southern Luzon passed through Bay and Calauan. One of them, an opulent Spaniard by the name of Iñigo, bought large tracts of land in Calauan in 1812. The landholdings of Iñigo and, later, of his heirs were so vast that many portions were still unsettled. The property was and still is, known as Hacienda Calauan. About a century later, the people of Calauan fought a “guardia civil” during the Philippine Revolution. Basilio Geiroza (better known as Cabesang Basilio) and his men routed a battalion of “guardia civiles” in a five-hour battle in Bario Cupangan (now Lamot I) in December 1897. During the subsequent Philippine-American hostilities, Calauan patriots fought numerically superior forces of General Otis in Barrio San Diego of San Pablo. With the establishment of civilian authority in Calauan in 1902, the Americans assigned Mariano Marfori as first “presidente”. Hacienda Calauan financed the construction of a hospital in 1926, and Mariano O. Marfori Jr. son of the first municipal presidente, as hospital director and the resident physician, respectively.

In 1939, by the request of President Quezon, Doña Margarita Roxas vda. de Soriano, granddaughter of the Spaniard, Iñigo., subdivided Hacienda Calauan and sold it to the tenants, part of what remained was converted into a rest house and a swimming pool and it became one of the tourist attractions until 1956.

In 1993, the town became the focus of media attention when Antonio Sanchez, who was serving as mayor at the time, got involved into a rape and double murder case involving two UPLB students. Sanchez and several other men were given a life sentence in March 1995.

Geography

Geographical landmarks 
Barangay Lamot 2 in Calauan is the site is the site of Mount Kalisungan, known for being site where retreating Japanese soldiers made their last stand in Laguna at the end of World War II.  The 760 MASL mountain is sometimes also known as Mount Nagcarlan or Mount Lamot, and is a traditional during holy week hiking site among locals. It is considered a hiker's favorite because it offers a clear view of Talim Island, Mount Tagapo, the Jalajala peninsula and Mount Sembrano to the north, the Caliraya highlands to the east, the seven lakes of San Pablo, Mount San Cristobal and Mount Banahaw to the south, and Mount Makiling to the west.

Barangays

Calauan is politically subdivided into 17 barangays.

 Balayhangin 
 Bangyas
 Dayap
 Hanggan
 Imok
 Lamot 1
 Lamot 2
 Limao
 Mabacan
 Masiit
 Paliparan
 Pérez
 Kanluran (Poblacion)
 Silangan (Poblacion)
 Prinza
 San Isidro
 Santo Tomas

Climate

Demographics

Economy

Government
Municipal officials (2013-2016):
George Berris" (UNA)
 Vice Mayor: Allan Jun "Dong" V. Sanchez (UNA)

Municipal Councilors:
 Chesskha J. Caumban (UNA)
 Allan Antonio V. Sanchez II (UNA)
 Bobby Ramilo (UNA)
 Dante Escarez (LP)
 Ma. Jesusa M. Larona (UNA)
 Joselito M. Manalo (UNA)
 Joseph P. Larona (UNA)
 Kraft Kingsly (LP)

References

External links

[ Philippine Standard Geographic Code]
Philippine Census Information
Local Governance Performance Management System

Municipalities of Laguna (province)
Populated places on Laguna de Bay